The EHF Challenge Trophy is an international handball tournament for developing handball nations.

There is both a male and female tournament.

Men's tournaments

Women's tournaments

References

External links
 European Handball Federation official website

 

European Handball Federation competitions